Shri S. Anbalagan is a politician from All India Anna Dravida Munnetra Kazhagam party, member of the Parliament of India representing Tamil Nadu in the Rajya Sabha, the upper house of the Indian Parliament.He is the vice-president of the AMMK (holds additional post of the president of the AMMK).

External links
Profile on Rajya Sabha website

Rajya Sabha members from Tamil Nadu
All India Anna Dravida Munnetra Kazhagam politicians
Living people
Year of birth missing (living people)
Tamil Nadu MLAs 1991–1996
Amma Makkal Munnetra Kazhagam politicians